Karl-Heinz Paqué (born 4 October 1956) is a German economist and politician of the liberal Free Democratic Party (FDP) who has been serving as head of the Friedrich Naumann Foundation since 2018. He was Minister of Finance in the state of Saxony-Anhalt from 2002 to 2006.

Early life and education
Paqué was born in the West German city of Saarbrücken and studied economics and achieved his PhD in 1980.

Political career
Paqué entered the FDP in 1999 and was State Minister of Finance in the government of Minister-President Wolfgang Böhmer of Saxony-Anhalt from 2002 to 2006.

Other activities
 Cologne Institute for Economic Research (IW Köln), Member of the Research Advisory Board 
 Halle Institute for Economic Research (IWH), Member of the Supervisory Board
 Agenda Austria, Chair of the Advisory Board (2013–2019)

References

Living people
1956 births
People from Saarbrücken
Free Democratic Party (Germany) politicians
Government ministers of Germany
Member of the Mont Pelerin Society